This East Cape to Cape Egmont Traverse is not so much a trail, but more a Kiwi pilgrimage to our early pioneers and landscape.

Two authors/walkers have completed this traverse and written books:
 Raymond Salisbury – Cape to Cape – 80 Day Traverse of the North Island 
 A H REED – From East Cape to Cape Egmont On Foot at Eighty-six. 1st Edition 1962.

At age 86 A.H. Reed didn't take the difficult Raukumara Range Forest Park route, but followed the east coast beaches south, visiting coastal communities, before heading west inland.  A great Kiwi feat none-the-less.

1970s: The proposed Cape Egmont to East Cape walkway 

Starting in the late 1970s the then Department of Survey and Land Information embarked on a project to link Cape Egmont to East Cape by a walkway.

At least one section of the ‘Cape Egmont to East Cape’ walkway was completed and still remains in use:
 Matemateāonga Range Track – a traditional Māori trail, then a dray track in the early 20th century.

2020: As a cycle tour 
Departing in February in 2020 this North Island traverse was completed as the "Kopiko Aotearoa" cycle tour:

West-East route:
Cape Egmont – Te Rewa Rewa Bridge – Hobbit Hole – Mangamataha Bridge – Centre of the North Island – Waiotapu – Carved pou – Lake Waikaremoana – Rere rock-slide – Motu Road – Bay of Plenty – East Cape Lighthouse

Other cyclists concurrently cycled the 2020 "Kopiko Aotearoa" cycle tour from east to west route.

References

External links
 Biography Alfred Hamish Reed MBE

Hiking and tramping tracks in New Zealand